State Route 212 (SR 212) is a  state highway that runs northwest-to-southeast through portions of DeKalb, Rockdale, Newton, Jasper, Putnam, and Baldwin counties in the central part of the U.S. state of Georgia. It runs from a point just southeast of Snapfinger southeast to Milledgeville.

Route description

Northwest of Monticello
SR 212 begins at an intersection with SR 155 (Snapfinger Road) southeast of Snapfinger, in the southeastern part of DeKalb County. It heads southeast into Rockdale County. It has an intersection with SR 138 (Stockbridge Highway). After entering Newton County, it meets SR 20, which has a very brief concurrency with it. In Snapping Shoals is SR 81. Shortly afterward, SR 212 briefly parallels the South River. The highway intersects SR 162 before crossing the Yellow River. A little distance later, it intersects SR 36. Just before crossing over Lake Jackson, it straddles the Newton–Jasper county line, going back and forth from one county to the other. When it is over the Lake, it enters Jasper County for the last time. The roadway continues to the southeast, until it reaches Monticello.

Monticello and Southeast areas
In Monticello, SR 212 intersects SR 16 (Washington Street). The two routes run concurrently to the east. In downtown Monticello, the concurrency meets SR 11/SR 83 (Forsyth Street). The two routes join the concurrency. One block later, SR 11 leaves to the southeast, following East Washington Street. Another block later, SR 83 departs the concurrency to the northeast, following North Warren Street. Just east of the town, SR 16 departs to the east, while SR 212 continues its southeastern routing. A short while later is an intersection with SR 380 (Perimeter Road), which serves as a partial bypass of Monticello. SR 212 enters Putnam County, where it has an intersection with US 129/SR 44 (Gray Road) at the eastern edge of the Oconee National Forest. It crosses over part of Lake Sinclair, and parallels a Norfolk Southern Railway track, before it meets its southeastern terminus, an intersection with SR 22 in the northwestern part of Milledgeville. Its routing bisects the area between Interstate 75 (I-75) and I-20.

Major intersections

See also

References

External links

 Georgia Roads (Routes 201 - 220)

212
Transportation in DeKalb County, Georgia
Transportation in Rockdale County, Georgia
Transportation in Newton County, Georgia
Transportation in Jasper County, Georgia
Transportation in Putnam County, Georgia
Transportation in Baldwin County, Georgia